Najat Makki (born 1956) is an Emirati visual artist. She is a member of the Dubai Cultural Council. and one of the pioneers in Emirati contemporary art scene.

Education 
Makki was the first Emirati woman to earn a government scholarship to study art abroad in 1977. She obtained her bachelor's and master's degrees in relief sculpture and metal from the College of Fine Arts in Cairo, where she also received her doctorate in the philosophy of art in 2001.

Influences 
Najat Makki was influenced by pioneer Egyptian artists such as Mokhtar, Mohamed Saeed, Hamed Nada, Brothers Wanly, Alsajini and Saed Alsader. Najat’s creativity also inspired by the local Emirates environment such as the desert, the sea and folklore. Her perception has a large impact on the artistic interpretations she has developed over time. Her work covers a variety of styles including realism and abstract expressionism.

“Everything has colour to me. When I was a child, my father owned an herbal medicine shop. It was full of boxes of all different herbs as well as indigo dye and alum-block. I used them all to paint on paper bags. That’s when I started to love colour. At home, I watched my sisters make cushions and curtains from brightly coloured material. I learned about light and shadow from watching my mother fold our clothes. My relationship with colour didn’t just come; I worked on it by learning from everything I saw.”

Selected exhibitions 
 2000 Woman & Arts; International View Exhibition- Sharjah
 2002 Emirates Media Inc. Exhibition; For you Jerusalem- Abu Dubai
 2002 Tehran Biennial- Iran
 2003 Sharjah Antiquities Museum- Sharjah, UAE
 2004 Environment Exhibition at Dubai Trade Center- Dubai, UAE
 2004 Immar International Arts Workshop- Dubai, UAE
 2004 Co- Exhibition with a Colleague Artist in the Occasion of UAE President Ascension Day held by Dubai International Airport- Dubai, UAE
 2004 Book Fair Exhibition- Frankfurt- Germany
 2004 Heritage Horizons Exhibition- Abu Dhabi Officers Club, UAE
 2014 Women/Creators: Visionary Women in the Emirates Art Scene, Abu Dhabi, UAE
 2015 the UAE national Pavilion, Venice Biennial, Italy
 2016 Portrait of a Nation- Abu Dhabi, UAE

Awards 
 1993 Jury Award, First Session of Sharjah International Biennial, UAE
 1996 General Authority of Youth & Sports Welfare-Silver Award, UAE
 1998 Gulf Cooperation Council Biennial Award
 1999 Al Mahabaa Syrian International Biennial, Syria
 2007 Emirates Appreciation Award for Arts, Science and Literature
 2008 The National Award for Arts, Science and Literature

References

Further reading 

Emirati painters
Living people
French artists
French women artists
Emirati contemporary artists
People from Dubai
Emirati women artists
1956 births
Emirati expatriates in Egypt
20th-century French women
College of Fine Arts in Cairo alumni